The 2020–21 Duquesne Dukes men's basketball team represented Duquesne University during the 2020–21 NCAA Division I men's basketball season. The team was led by fourth-year head coach Keith Dambrot, and played their home games at the UPMC Cooper Fieldhouse in Pittsburgh, Pennsylvania and Kerr Fitness Center in McCandless, Pennsylvania as a member of the Atlantic 10 Conference. They finished the season 9-9, 7-7 in A-10 Play to finish in 9th place. They defeated Richmond in the second round of the A-10 tournament before losing in the quarterfinals to St. Bonaventure.

Previous season
The Dukes finished the 2019–20 season 21–9, 11–7 in A-10 play to finish in sixth place. As the No. 6 seed in the A-10 tournament, they were scheduled to face No. 14 Fordham in the second round, but the tournament was canceled due to the COVID-19 pandemic.

Offseason

Departures

Incoming transfers

2020 recruiting class

Roster

Schedule and results

|-
!colspan=12 style=|Non-conference regular season

|-
!colspan=12 style=|Atlantic 10 regular season

|-
!colspan=12 style=| A-10 tournament

References

Duquesne Dukes men's basketball seasons
Duquesne Dukes
Duquesne Dukes men's basketball
Duquesne Dukes men's basketball